Rawleigh Williams III (born August 28, 1996) is a former American football running back. He played college football at the University of Arkansas.

Early years
Williams III attended Bishop Lynch High School in Dallas, Texas. During his career he rushed for 5,023 yards and 71 touchdowns, including  2,814 yards and 37 touchdowns his senior year. He originally committed to the University of Mississippi to play college football, but changed to the University of Arkansas.

College career
As a true freshman at Arkansas in 2015, Williams rushed for 254 yards on 56 carries over seven games. He missed the final six games of the season after suffering a neck injury. Williams returned from the injury in 2016 and took over as the starting running back. He ended the regular season with an SEC leading 1,326 yards with 12 touchdowns. On May 8, 2017, Williams announced that he was stepping down from football due to an injury he suffered during spring activities.

Work
In 2021, Williams was named a partner at the sports division of management company Milk & Honey.

References

External links

Arkansas Razorbacks bio

1996 births
Living people
Players of American football from Dallas
American football running backs
Arkansas Razorbacks football players